Petr Rajnoha (born in 1974) is a Czech organist.

He is a graduate of the Conservatory in Brno and the Faculty of Music of the Academy of Performing Arts in Prague under the tutelage of Prof. Jaroslav Tůma. In 1996 – 1997 he continued his studies at the Conservatoire de Paris under Professor Susan Landale.

In 2006, Rajnoha recorded the Five Concert Fantasies by Josef Klička for the Czech label ARTA Records.

Prizes 
 Prizes at International Performers Competition  in Brno 1997
 Prague Spring International Music Competition 1999
 First Prizes at International Organ Competition Nuremberg 2000

References

External links
http://www.petrrajnoha.cz

Czech classical organists
Male classical organists
1974 births
Living people
21st-century organists
21st-century Czech male musicians